Frank Church High School is an alternative public secondary school in Boise, Idaho, operated by the Boise School District. Opened in 2008, it was formed from the merger of Mountain Cove High School and Fort Boise Mid High School. It serves grades 9–12, with the majority of the enrollment in the upper grades.

FCHS is named after Frank Church, a prominent U.S. Senator from 1957 to 1981, and an alumnus of Boise High School, class of 1942. The school is located in southwest Boise, immediately east of the new West Junior High School, also opened in 2008. FCHS also hosts the Boise Evening School program and B.A.S.E (Boise Alternative to Suspension and Expulsion) formerly known as the Victory Academy.

Principals
In 2008–2009, the principal was Robert Thompson and the vice principals were Sandy Wargo and Cedric Minter. The 2009–2010 vice principals were Ted Totorica and Kristen Duskey. In 2010–2011 the principal was former vice principal Minter, and the vice principals were Camille Fraley and Mark Bleazard.

In 2019–2020, the principal was Nathan Dennis and the vice principals were Tammy Burks and Erin Kubena.

References

External links
 
 YouTube video - Frank Church High School - Feb 2012

Alternative schools in the United States
Educational institutions established in 2008
Treasure Valley
High schools in Boise, Idaho
Public high schools in Idaho
2008 establishments in Idaho